Brigadier-General David Bruce Cochrane, MSM, CD is a Royal Canadian Air Force officer.

Col. Cochrane assumed command of CFB Trenton, as well as the primary lodger unit for the base, 8 Wing, on February 19, 2010, eleven days after his predecessor, Russell Williams, was formally charged under the Criminal Code with two counts of first-degree murder along with two counts of forcible confinement and two counts of break and enter and sexual assault.

Col. Cochrane graduated from Royal Military College of Canada in 1986 with a degree in mechanical engineering, and later qualified as a navigator. In 2009, he deployed overseas for six months and served in the War in Afghanistan as commanding officer of Theatre Support Element Roto 8.

Colonel Dave Cochrane was promoted to the Rank of Brigadier-General in Royal Canadian Air Force on 11 February 2015.

He transferred command of CFB Trenton in August 2011. He graduated from the year-long Australian Defence College, Centre for Defence and Strategic Studies Course. Brigadier-General Cochrane assumed the position of Senior Advisor to the National Security Advisor in the Privy Council Office in Ottawa in early 2013. Promoted to Brigadier-General in 2015, he assumed the position of Commander 2 Canadian Air Division in Winnipeg overseeing individual training and education for RCAF officers and non-commissioned members (NCMs). was appointed to the command of 2 Canadian Air Division in Winnipeg.

In summer 2018, BGen Cochrane was appointed Commander National Cadet and Junior Canadian Ranger Support Group in Ottawa, succeeding BGen Kelly Woiden.

In 2020, BGen Cochrane retired from service.

Honours and decorations
Brig. Gen.  Dave Cochrane Has Been Awarded the Following Honours and Decorations During His Military Career.

 Brig. Gen. Dave Cochrane has earned the Canadian Forces Air Combat Systems Officer (ACSO) Wings.
 

|-

|-

|-

References

Royal Canadian Air Force generals
Royal Military College of Canada alumni
Living people
Recipients of the Meritorious Service Decoration
Year of birth missing (living people)